Kiyoshi Igusa (born November 28, 1949) is a Japanese-American mathematician and a professor at Brandeis University. He works in representation theory and topology.

Education and career 
He studied at the University of Chicago and Princeton University, where he obtained his Ph.D. in 1979, under the direction of Allen Hatcher.

From 1981 to 1983, he was a Sloan Fellow, and since 2012 he is a Fellow of the American Mathematical Society.

Personal life
Igusa's father, Jun-Ichi Igusa, was also a mathematician. Igusa is married to Gordana Todorov, with whom he is a frequent collaborator.

Selected publications

References

External links 
  (Personal Website)

Fellows of the American Mathematical Society
1949 births
Living people
Brandeis University faculty
American people of Japanese descent
University of Chicago alumni
Princeton University alumni
21st-century American mathematicians
Sloan Research Fellows
20th-century American mathematicians
Topologists